Eluka Majaka is a Telugu language comedy film directed by Relangi Narasimha Rao. The film stars Vennela Kishore, Brahmanandam, Raghu Babu and Pavani. This Flim is dubbed in Tamil as "Ellame Elimayam" which premiered on Star Vijay Super .The film is the jointly produced by Marella Narasimha Rao and Vaddempudi Srinivasa Rao under the production company Naa Friends Art Movies. This is the 75th film of Relangi Narasimha Rao.

Plot
Balu (Vennela Kishore) falls in love with Swapna (Pavani) and her father Chakravarthy (Raghu Babu), a strict disciplinarian, agrees to their marriage. On the day of their engagement, Balu's friend Surya (Surya), drags a reluctant Balu to Lord Ganesh's temple. Balu is afraid that Chakravarthy may cancel the engagement if he is late. So he insists with Surya that they leave the temple. In the ensuing argument between them, Balu ends up insulting Lord Ganesha. Ganesha's mount, Shri Dinka murti is enraged and sends a mouse (Brahmanandam) to teach Balu a lesson. The mouse wreaks havoc in the lives of Balu and Swapna.

Cast
 Vennela Kishore as Balu
 Brahmanandam as Mushika
 Raghu Babu as Chakravarti
 Pavani as Swapna
 Ping Pong Surya as Surya
 Shobha as Samanta
 Annapoorna
 Kondavalasa Lakshmana Rao
 Allari Subhashini
 Tirupathi Prakash as Chakravarti's assistant
 Geetanjali as Roja
 Sri Lakshmi (Guest appearance)

Production
The director and the screenwriter Diwakara Babu developed the screenplay inspired by a serial story that appeared in a Telugu magazine titled Eluka Vache Illu Bhadram and written by Ilapavuluri Murali Mohan Rao

Eluka Majaka is a debut production for Marella Narasimha Rao and Vaddempudi Srinivasa Rao. Pavani debuts as a lead actress in the film. The film involves nearly forty minutes of extensive computer graphics. Since this was the first film for the director Narasimha Rao to work with computer graphics, he sought advice from his long-time friend and director Kodi Ramakrishna who is famous for CG involved movies including Ammoru, Devi Putrudu, Anji and Arundhati.

Nagendra Kumar M who has previously worked for sixteen films with Relangi is the cameraman for this film. While Ballepalli Mohan, an assistant to Vandemataram Srinivas, is debuting as a music director. Computer Graphics by Sagili Satyanarayana Reddy.

Soundtrack

References

External links

2016 films
2010s Telugu-language films
2010s fantasy comedy films
Indian fantasy comedy films
Films directed by Relangi Narasimha Rao
2016 comedy films